An instigator is a person who intentionally encourages or starts something. The term may also refer to:
 Instigator Regni, a prosecutor's office
 Instigator (album), by Kaci Brown
 The Instigator, an album by Rhett Miller
 "Instigator", a song by D12 from Devil's Night